In popular culture, sets of precious substances may form hierarchies which express conventional perceived relative value or merit. Precious metals appear prominently in such hierarchies, but as they grow, gems and semi-precious materials may be introduced as part of the system. The sequences can provide interesting examples of the arbitrariness of semiotic signs.

Traditional manifestations
Jubilees have a hierarchy of years: silver (25 years), ruby (40 years), golden (50 years), diamond (60 years), and platinum (70 years).  Wedding anniversaries extend the jubilee hierarchy with various sequences of substances filling in many of the gaps between the same major milestones. In 2017 the 65th anniversary of the accession of Elizabeth II was widely referred to as her "sapphire jubilee" or more specifically as her blue sapphire jubilee (see Sapphire Jubilee of Queen Elizabeth II)  but more traditionally the sapphire anniversary is considered to be the 45th.
In general usage no precious stone is considered to outrank the diamond.  

Ancient Greek mythic-cultural cosmology depicted a decline from a golden age to a silver age followed by an Iron Age. In some variants there is a Bronze Age, an interim between the Iron Age and Silver Age.

In Japan, the traditional Sho Chiku Bai (松竹梅) ranking system has a hierarchy of pine , bamboo , and plum .  This is commonly used by restaurants to indicate how elaborate (and expensive) set meals are.

Modern adaptations
The measurement of sales of popular music starts high relative to the wedding anniversary scale, concentrating on gold and platinum (see gold album).  Likewise, credit card companies usually have a "gold card" and a "platinum card" (many formerly had a "silver card" then followed by a "gold card", but due to similarity in appearance between silver and platinum these were often discontinued with the rise in popularity of platinum as a precious metal).

Sports events have a well-established convention (introduced into the Olympic tradition at the 1904 Summer Olympics), of a hierarchy of medals: bronze medal - silver medal - gold medal. This presumably echoes conventional coinage systems, in which cheap bronze or copper denominations could aggregate to intermediate silver coins, then to gold money. The archetypal British designations (penny, shilling and pound) parallel and reflect this hierarchy.

Events-sponsorship in sport or in the arts may involve (for example) silver, gold and/or platinum sponsors.

Fantasy role playing games often have a hierarchy of materials, following the relative strengths of pre-modern metals, bronze, iron and steel, for example, at the lower end, and moving up through fantastic or legendary materials such as mithril and adamant.

The "golden age" metaphor is extended to a number of disciplines, for example the golden age of science fiction.

Some multiplayer video games feature a hierarchy of players that uses precious metal names to distinguish the various levels of skill, often progressing from Bronze to Silver, to Gold, to Platinum, then to Diamond.

See also
 Wedding anniversary#Celebration and gifts

References

Precious substances
Precious metals